Leptodactylus troglodytes (common names: Pernambuco white-lipped frog, hole-dwelling thin-toed frog, sibilator frog) is a species of frogs in the family Leptodactylidae. It is endemic to northeastern Brazil and occurs from northern Minas Gerais and Bahia to Maranhão, Piauí, Ceará, and Rio Grande do Norte. The specific name, troglodytes, refers to its habit of breeding in underground chambers.

Description
Adult males measure  and adult females  in snout–vent length. The tympanum is distinct. Males have more acuminate snout than females. Dorsal folds are absent and dorsolateral folds are indistinct or (usually) absent; lateral folds are also absent or interrupted. The belly is uniformly light.

Reproduction
This species builds foam nests in underground chambers near water. Single tunnel may have multiple chambers. Males are territorial and emit territorial as well as courtship calls, to which the female may reciprocate.

Habitat and conservation
Leptodactylus troglodytes is a common species that occurs in dry and moist savanna and agricultural land in the Cerrado and Caatinga ecosystems and in dune systems in Atlantic Rainforest zone. It is impacted by intensive agriculture, overgrazing by livestock, and fire, but is not considered threatened as species.

References

troglodytes
Endemic fauna of Brazil
Amphibians of Brazil
Amphibians described in 1926
Taxa named by Adolfo Lutz
Taxonomy articles created by Polbot